Edward P. Wojnaroski Sr. (born July 22, 1939) is a former Democratic member of the Pennsylvania House of Representatives, who represented the 71st District.  He and his wife live in Johnstown, Pennsylvania and have 1 child. He retired prior to the 2008 election and was succeeded by Democrat Bryan Barbin.

References

External links
Pennsylvania House of Representatives – Edward P. Wojnaroski official PA House website (archived)
 official Party website (archived)
Biography, voting record, and interest group ratings at Project Vote Smart

1939 births
Living people
Democratic Party members of the Pennsylvania House of Representatives
Politicians from Johnstown, Pennsylvania